Victor Rodriguez Sumulong (May 19, 1946 – January 6, 2009) was a Filipino politician.

Political career

Sumulong was named Assistant Secretary for the Department of Local Government and Community Development by President Ferdinand Marcos in 1975. From 1992 to 1996, Sumulong served as Undersecretary for Local Government of the Department of the Interior and Local Government under the administration of President Fidel Ramos.

Sumulong was elected as a congressman of Antipolo from 1998 to 2004 and a congressman of 2nd District of Antipolo from 2004 to 2007. He was elected Mayor of Antipolo in 2007 and served until his death on January 6, 2009, due to multiple organ failure resulting from diabetes.

References

|-

|-

1946 births
2009 deaths
20th-century Filipino lawyers
Ateneo de Manila University alumni
De La Salle University alumni
University of the Philippines alumni
People from Antipolo
Deaths from multiple organ failure
Deaths from diabetes
Nationalist People's Coalition politicians
Kabalikat ng Malayang Pilipino politicians
Mayors of places in Rizal
Members of the House of Representatives of the Philippines from Antipolo
Ramos administration personnel
Ferdinand Marcos administration personnel
Recipients of the Presidential Medal of Merit (Philippines)
Mayors of Antipolo